The Lost Tapes is an American documentary series that aired on the Smithsonian Channel.

Summary
Archival footages from various sources (local and national news media, home movies and recordings) are used to offer new perspectives on important events of the 20th and 21st centuries.

Episodes
Pearl Harbor attack
Assassination of Malcolm X
Tet Offensive
Apollo 13
Patty Hearst
Tornadoes of 1974
Son of Sam
1992 Los Angeles riots
Impeachment of Bill Clinton
D.C. sniper attacks

See also
June 17th, 1994
LA 92
The Atomic Cafe

References

External links
Official website
Official YouTube playlist featuring three episodes (Malcolm X, LA riots and Son of Sam)
Paramount+

Collage television
2010s American documentary television series
Smithsonian Channel original programming